The Lubang forest mouse (Apomys lubangensis) is a forest mouse endemic to Lubang Island in the Philippines.

References

Apomys
Rodents of the Philippines
Mammals described in 2014
Endemic fauna of the Philippines